Tebufenozide is an insecticide that acts as a molting hormone.  It is an agonist of the ecdysone receptor that causes premature molting in larvae.  It is primarily used against caterpillar pests.

Because it has high selectivity for the targeted pests and low toxicity otherwise, the company that discovered tebufenozide, Rohm and Haas, was given a Presidential Green Chemistry Award for its development.

It has been characterised, along with RH-2485, as a bisacylhydrazine.

Its environmental half-life varies according to where it is released and under what conditions, but can be said to be on the order of months.

It has been used for "an insect growth regulator, to control leaf-eating insects that cause damage or death in trees. Tebufenozide is the active ingredient in" Bayer's MIMIC "formulation, which controls forest defoliator pests such as gypsy moths, tent caterpillars, budworms, tussock moths and cabbage looper. These are all pests of the order Lepidoptera."

It has been used against the sugarcane borer, although the population grows immunity.

In California, the substance was used chiefly for crops of head lettuce, celery, raspberries, cauliflower, and tomatoes for processing.

A 1994 study conducted by the Canadian Forest Service in laboratory conditions concluded that the substance was very stable in acidic and neutral buffers at 20 °C, hydrolytic degradation was dependent on pH and temperature, sunlight photodegradation was observed at a slower rate than ultraviolet photodegradation, and that microbial metabolism and photolysis are the two main degradative routes for tebufenozide in natural aquatic systems.

The final degradation products of tebufenozide are various alcohols, carboxylic acids and ketones of low toxicity.

Derivatives

Furan tebufenozide
In 2010, laboratory tests and field tests were performed on furan tebufenozide. The results were on the order of one hundred days.

References

Insecticides
Hydrazides
Tert-butyl compounds